The 2018–19 Villanova Wildcats women's basketball team represented Villanova University in the 2018–19 NCAA Division I women's basketball season. The Wildcats, led by 41st-year head coach Harry Perretta, returned to play home games at the newly updated Finneran Pavilion after a 1-year renovation and were members of the Big East Conference. They finished the season 19–13, 9–9 in Big East play to finish in a tie for fourth place. They lost in the quarterfinals of the Big East women's tournament to Georgetown. They received an at-large bid to the WNIT where they defeated Old Dominion in the first round before losing to West Virginia in the second round.

Roster

Schedule

|-
!colspan=9 style=| Exhibition

|-
!colspan=9 style=| Regular season

|-
!colspan=9 style=| Big East Women's Tournament

|-
!colspan=9 style=| WNIT

Rankings
2018–19 NCAA Division I women's basketball rankings

^Coaches did not release a Week 2 poll.

See also
 2018–19 Villanova Wildcats men's basketball team

References

Villnova
Villanova Wildcats women's basketball seasons
Villanova
Villanova
Villanova